Cyclonic vortex may refer to:
Upper tropospheric cyclonic vortex, a vortex that usually moves slowly from east-northeast to west-southwest, and generally does not extend below 20,000 feet in altitude.
Low-level tropospheric cyclonic vortices are known as low-pressure areas